Alfredo Sabbadin (20 January 1936 – 26 March 2016) was an Italian professional racing cyclist. He rode in two editions of the Tour de France.

References

External links
 

1936 births
2016 deaths
Italian male cyclists
Cyclists from the Metropolitan City of Venice